The 2022–23 Australian region cyclone season is the period of the year when most tropical cyclones form in the Southern Indian Ocean and Pacific Oceans between 90°E and 160°E. The season officially started on 1 November 2022 and will finish on 30 April 2023, however, a tropical cyclone could form at any time between 1 July 2022 and 30 June 2023 and would count towards the season total. During the season, tropical cyclones will be officially monitored by one of the three tropical cyclone warning centres (TCWCs) for the region which are operated by the Australian Bureau of Meteorology, National Weather Service of Papua New Guinea and the Indonesian Agency for Meteorology, Climatology and Geophysics. The United States Joint Typhoon Warning Center (JTWC) and other national meteorological services including Météo-France and the Fiji Meteorological Service will also monitor the basin during the season.



Season forecasts

During October 2022, Bureau of Meteorology (BoM), New Zealand's MetService, and the National Institute of Water and Atmospheric Research (NIWA) issued its tropical cyclone outlook for the 2022–23 season. The outlook called for an above-average number of tropical cyclones for the 2022–23 season, with eleven tropical cyclones, predicted to occur. For the Australian region, the BoM predicted that the season would feature, only a 73% chance of more tropical cyclones. For the Western region, it was predicted that activity would be above average, with a 69% chance of tropical cyclone activity. The northern region and northwestern subregion would also see fewer tropical cyclones, with only a 61% and 70% chance of more tropical cyclones than average.

The BoM issued two seasonal forecasts for the Southern Pacific Ocean, for their self-defined eastern and western regions of the South Pacific Ocean. They predicted that the South-West Pacific region between 142.5°E and 165°E, had a 65% chance of seeing activity above its average of 4 tropical cyclones. The BoM also predicted that the South-East Pacific region between 165°E and 120°W, had a 43% chance of seeing activity above its average of 6 tropical cyclones.

Climate models also suggest that El Niño Southern Oscillation (ENSO) will return to neutral conditions in 2023. The BoM noted that sea surface temperature anomalies across the equatorial Indian Ocean. Warmer-than-average waters are expected to persist to the north of Australia for the next three months, increasing the likelihood of tropical cyclones. The BoM also predicted that the Eastern Region had a 74% chance of seeing activity above its average of 4 tropical cyclones. These outlooks accounted included the state of the ENSO. A higher average risk of tropical cyclones was also predicted by NIWA for nations east of the International Date Line.

Season summary

A tropical low formed on 26 July and was later designated as 01U, an exceptionally early start to the season. The system attained tropical-storm-force winds and persistent deep convection for a couple of days before wind shear began to increase. In-post analysis, 01U was upgraded to a Category 1 tropical cyclone (Australian scale). In November, tropical low 02U was designated by the BoM and encountered marginally favorable conditions. The low was upgraded to Tropical Cyclone 04S by JTWC after tropical-storm-force winds were found. Later in the month, a tropical low formed and was a long-lived system before dissipating on 26 November. There was also another tropical low that formed in the Gulf of Carpentaria but did not develop further. In December, tropical low 05U formed, and was given the name Darian after intensifying into a Category 1 Tropical Cyclone. On 19 December, it became the first Severe Tropical Cyclone of the season. Throughout the day, the storm unexpectedly entered very favorable conditions, and underwent rapid intensification. It reached Category 5 on the BoM's scale the next day, and peaked as a Category 4 on the SSHWS scale, later exiting into the South-west Indian Ocean Basin. Later that month, a tropical low formed, later intensifying into a Category 1 Tropical Cyclone and was named Ellie. Ellie then later crossed the Northern Territory coast, making landfall at a sparsely populated location southwest of Daly River at 13:30 UTC (11:00 pm ACST).  Shortly after the landfall, the JTWC discontinued warnings on the system. 

The next day, the BoM's released its last bulletin on Ellie, as the system weakened into a tropical low. However, Ellie remained traceable, as it moved southwest towards the Western Australia region throughout the rest of December. The BoM then gave the tropical low a moderate chance of redeveloping into a tropical cyclone on 1 January. The storm then moved southeast and further weakened as it moved inland once again. On 6 January, the BoM stated that Tropical Low 07U formed from a monsoon trough over northeastern Australia. The JTWC later upgraded it to a Category 1 Tropical Cyclone (Australian Scale), and dubbed it as Cyclone 07P. However, the BoM did not upgrade the system due to lacking a well-defined center. 07U later moved into the South Pacific basin and was named Hale. Later in January, a tropical low become 06F in the South Pacific basin, and Tropical Lows 10U and 12U remained weak. In February, activity increased across the basin, with the formations of Tropical Low 11U, Freddy, and Gabrielle. Freddy took advantage of the favorable conditions and intensified to a Category 3 severe tropical cyclone. Gabrielle also steadily intensified to a severe tropical cyclone as the cyclone headed southeast and moved into the South Pacific basin on 10 February. 11U exited the Australian Region basin and was named Dingani in the Southwest Indian Ocean basin. Freddy later rapidly intensified to a Category 4 on both the Australian and SSHWS scales. Another tropical low, 15U, formed on 11 February and lasted until 17 February. After 15U, a weak tropical low formed, followed by tropical lows 16U and 17U. Another weak tropical low, 18U, formed on 27 February. 17U was last noted on 27 February, and on 1 March, 18U moved into the South Pacific basin, where it became Kevin.

Systems

Tropical Cyclone 01U 

On 26 July, the Bureau of Meteorology (BoM) reported that a tropical low had formed due to an increase in monsoonal storm activity during the Madden–Julian Oscillation (MJO). Deep convection became more pronounced and organized with an upper-level trough around the center. By 15:00 UTC on 28 July, the Joint Typhoon Warning Center (JTWC) issued a Tropical Cyclone Formation Alert (TCFA) for the disturbance. The system was located in a favorable environment, with sea surface temperatures ranging from 28 to 30 degrees Celsius, and the JTWC issued their first warning on the storm six hours later as Tropical Cyclone 01S. At 09:00 UTC on 31 July, the JTWC issued their final warning on the system. Later that day, 01U completely dissipated. The cyclone did not have any impacts on the Cocos Islands despite its period of strong winds, which were less than gale-force.

Tropical Low 02U 

On 1 November, the BoM began tracking a tropical low to the northwestern of the region. Satellite imagery revealed that the system was displaced from its center of circulation. Environmental conditions were assessed by the BoM as being unfavorable for significant intensification of the system. The system was assigned the official identifier code 02U. Over the past twelve hours, the system has improved. At 03:00 UTC on 3 November, the JTWC issued a TCFA, after noting its obscure low-level circulation center (LLCC). Later that day, the JTWC subsequently initiated advisories on the system and classified it as Tropical Cyclone 04S. The system had a broad and fully exposed LLCC, although there has been some increased thunderstorm activity associated with the system. The BoM's stopped tracking the system. The system briefly crossed into the South-West Indian Ocean basin on 5 November.

Severe Tropical Cyclone Darian 

However, over the next 5 days, conditions improved, with vertical wind shear decreasing. At 11:30 UTC on 17 December, satellite imagery showed a partially exposed low-level center embedded in deep convection, prompting the JTWC's to issue a TCFA. On the next day, the system strengthened into a Category 1-cyclone on the Australian scale, with BoM naming it Darian. Later that day, the JTWC initiated advisories on the system and classified it as Tropical Cyclone 05S. The BoM's assessed the cyclone to have strengthened into a Category 2 cyclone on 19 December and later to Category 3 cyclone on the Australian scale.

Darian then strengthened to a Category 3 equivalent cyclone on the SSHWS in an environment of low wind shear, warm sea surface temperatures and good upper-level poleward outflow, which led to the storm having a symmetric  eye. The cyclone quickly intensified, and was upgraded to a Category 4 cyclone by the BoM. Similarly, the JTWC's further upgraded Darian to a Category 4-equivalent cyclone around 21:00 UTC, while exhibiting some annular characteristics. Darian continued to rapidly intensify, and reached Category 5 intensity on the Australian scale at 00:00 UTC on 21 December. Later that day, it exited the basin and moved into the South-West Indian Ocean basin.

Tropical Cyclone Ellie 

On 20 December, the BoM reported that a tropical low was slowly developing over the Timor Sea. Initially located in a favorable environment for intensification, the disturbance began to encounter somewhat improved conditions. Satellite imagery indicated an improvement in the structure of the disturbance, with the system displaying an increase in flaring deep convection. The JTWC issued a TCFA for the system at 02:00 UTC on 22 December. The low was assigned the official identifier code 06U. By 09:00 UTC, the JTWC subsequently designated the storm as Tropical Cyclone 06S, citing that convection quickly became better organized and more concentrated around the broad center. Later that day, the BoM's reported that the tropical low had developed into a Category 1-cyclone on the Australian scale and named it Ellie. Ellie then later crossed the Northern Territory (NT) coast, making landfall at a sparsely populated location southwest of Daly River at 13:30 UTC (11:00 pm ACST). Shortly after the landfall, the JTWC discontinued warnings on the system. The next day, the BoM's released its last bulletin on Ellie, as the system weakened into a tropical low. However, Ellie remained traceable, as it moved southwest towards the Western Australia region throughout the rest of December. The BoM then gave the tropical low a moderate chance of redeveloping into a tropical cyclone on 1 January. However, they later downgraded its chances of redeveloping into very low, as the storm turned southeast further inland and was weakening.

In anticipation of Ellie, the BoM issued a tropical cyclone warning for the coast of Western Australia and Northern Territory. The cyclone mainly caused torrential rainfall and gale-force wind gusts along the Top End as it became a tropical cyclone. Timber Creek experienced "once-in-50-year" flooding as the cyclone moved through the town by 24 December. Flooding continued into January, with WA Emergency Services Minister, Stephen Dawson, saying that it was a "once in a century" flood crisis. Infrastructure was damaged and remote Indigenous communities completely cut off. Defence personnel were deployed to the Kimberley region in WA, three RAAF aircraft were provided to evacuate residents, and five helicopters were despatched to help with the crisis. Hardship payments were made by the state, territory and Commonwealth governments, and Prime Minister Anthony Albanese promised  "massive infrastructure investment" when he visited the area afterwards.

Tropical Low 07U (Hale) 

By 31 December, the BoM noted the potential of a tropical low forming over the Coral Sea, as the monsoon was forecast to strengthen further over the region. Three days later, the agency put a low chance for the potential low to develop into a tropical cyclone in the region. The JTWC gave it a medium chance to develop into a tropical cyclone, before issuing a TCFA saying that the chance for the system to develop into a tropical cyclone was high 8 hours later. With a favorable environment of low wind shear, warm sea surface temperatures, and good radial outflow, the system intensified into a tropical cyclone late on the same day according to the JTWC, and designating it as 07P. The BoM did not upgrade 07U as such, citing that its center was elongated northwest to the southeast. 07U then later exited the basin and moved into the South Pacific basin.

Tropical Low 10U 

On 19 January, the BoM noted that a tropical low may form within a monsoon trough that was forming over the Gulf of Carpentaria, and was expected to extend into the Arafura Sea.

Tropical Low 11U (Dingani) 

On 24 January, the BoM noted that a tropical low may form within a trough in the central Indian Ocean. Three days later, as the tropical low was forming, the agency designated it as 11U. The low embedded within the monsoon trough on 28 January. By 13:00 UTC on 29 January, the JTWC had also began monitoring the area of disturbance. Later on 4 February, the BoM later issued advisories for the system as it approached Cocos Islands. Six hours later, the system was poorly organised with deep atmospheric convection. 11U exited the basin towards the South-West Indian Ocean on 9 February.

Tropical Low 12U 

On 30 January, the BoM highlighted that a weak low could form near Christmas Island, as the monsoon trough began to be more active across the tropics. By the next day, the weak low formed within the trough, and the agency classified it as 12U. For the next few days, the low moved slowly, before encountering unfavorable conditions for development by 3 February.

Severe Tropical Cyclone Freddy 

On 30 January, the BoM began monitoring a developing weak tropical low embedded within a monsoon trough in Timor Sea. By 1 February, as the tropical low was forming, the disturbance was assigned the official identifier code 13U. Environmental conditions were assessed as being marginally conducive for tropical cyclogenesis. During 6 February, the JTWC issued a TCFA on the system. By 09:00 UTC, the JTWC initiated advisories on the system and classified it as Tropical Cyclone 11S. The BoM upgraded the system to Tropical Cyclone Freddy, citing that deep convection increased near the center of the cyclone. Throughout the next day, feeder bands were covering its very broad and central dense overcast (CDO), prompting the JTWC to upgrade the system to a Category 1-equivalent cyclone. 

The BoM subsequently followed suit and upgraded Freddy into a Category 2 tropical cyclone. Freddy began showing an eye feature first seen in microwave imaging, with Freddy later becoming a Category 2-equivalent cyclone. Freddy weakened slightly due to CDO and a persistent area of cold cloud tops. Freddy weakened back into a tropical storm, and the BoM's estimated winds of  due to its easterly winds, which resulted in moderate wind shear. During 11 February, Freddy had intensified to a Category 4 severe tropical cyclone due to the presence of a well-defined eye surrounded by deep cold convection. Freddy underwent rapid deepening and reached a Category 4-equivalent cyclone with a symmetric CDO. During 14 February, it exited the basin and entered the South-West Indian Ocean basin.

Severe Tropical Cyclone Gabrielle 

 
On 5 February, the BoM reported that Tropical Low 14U was forming within a monsoonal trough of low pressure over the northeastern Coral Sea near the Solomon Islands. At around the same time, the system's LLCC was exposed with persistent disorganized convection. Over the next day, as the system moved southwards, it developed further, with satellite imagery showing an increase in the cyclonic curvature of the convection. Later at 06:00 UTC, the JTWC issued a TCFA, after noting its obscure LLC. By 03:00 UTC on 8 February, the JTWC initiated advisories on the system and classified it as Tropical Cyclone 12P, when the fragmented banding was wrapping broadly into the exposed consolidating LLC. Late on the same day, the BoM reported that the tropical low had developed into a Category 1 tropical cyclone and named it Gabrielle. By 18:00 UTC on 9 February, the storm continued to intensify and soon became a Category 3 severe tropical cyclone. Later the next day, it exited the basin and moved into the South Pacific basin, where it became a Category 2-equivalent cyclone.

Tropical Low 15U 

On 11 February, the BoM reported that Tropical Low 15U was forming over the eastern Top End. The JTWC had also begun monitoring the disturbance, which the agency classified it by the code identifier Invest 91P, and gave it a low chance for development. The next day, the JTWC later upgraded the system's chance for development to medium. The BoM later assessed 15U to still be a weak tropical low, and gave it a low chance for development. The low then moved slowly southeastwards, before moving inland on 16 February and being last noted on the BoM's tropical cyclone outlooks by the next day.

Tropical Low 16U 

On 17 February, the BoM noted that a tropical low may form to the north of Pilbara. It was designated as 16U three days later. On 23 February, the BoM reported that 16U had formed to the north of the coast of Pilbara. It eventually merged with 17U and moved over land to the NT/WA border, prompting the BoM to issue heavy rain and wind warnings. On 5 March, it emerged over into the Gulf of Carpentaria, where the BoM upgraded its chance of formation to low.

Tropical Low 17U 

On 24 February, the BoM reported that a weak tropical low which they classified as 17U was located over land to the south of the Joseph Bonaparte Gulf. 17U was last noted on 27 February.

Tropical Low 18U (Kevin)

On 27 February, a weak tropical low formed off the coast in Queensland. The BoM designated it as 18U. The JTWC began monitoring the tropical low and setting the chance of tropical cyclone development as low. On 1 March, the JTWC issued a TCFA on the system due to the system having much improved structure. The tropical low entered the South Pacific basin the same day where it became designated as Tropical Depression 09F by the FMS.

Other systems 
On 15 November, the BoM reported a weak tropical low near southern Indonesia. The JTWC released a TCFA stating that the low could intensify soon and called it Invest 94S. The next day, the JTWC canceled its TCFA and lowered its chances to low. It continued to move eastwards before being last noted on 24 November.

On 30 November, the BoM reported that a weak tropical low had developed along a trough over central Gulf of Carpentaria. It generally moved southeast before being last noted by BoM on 2 December, near the western Cape York Peninsula.

On 13 January, the BoM noted the potential of a tropical low forming in the eastern Coral Sea. By the next day, the Fiji Meteorological Service (FMS) designated the potential low as Tropical Disturbance 05F, while it was still in the BoM's area of responsibility. 05F briefly entered the South Pacific basin on 15 January, before subsequently moving back into the region late by the same day. On 16 January, the BoM upgraded 05F into a weak tropical low. The JTWC issued a TCFA on the system on 17 January, stating its chance to develop into a tropical cyclone was high. Later that day, it exited the basin again and moved into the South Pacific basin.

On 15 January, the BoM noted the potential of another tropical low forming, this time in the northern Coral Sea, within a monsoon trough that was expected to form. Two days later, the agency reported that the tropical low had formed, and gave it a high chance of developing into a tropical cyclone within the basin. The JTWC subsequently issued a TCFA the next day. Continuing southeastwards, the tropical low then exited the basin and into the South Pacific basin on 20 January, where it was immediately designated as Tropical Depression 06F by the FMS.

On 17 February, the BoM reported that a weak tropical low had formed, within a trough, to the south of Indonesia. It was last noted the next day.

On 20 March, a weak tropical low was located between Vanuatu and New Caledonia.

Storm names

Bureau of Meteorology 
The Australian Bureau of Meteorology (TCWC Melbourne) monitors all tropical cyclones that form within the Australian region, including any within the areas of responsibility of TCWC Jakarta or TCWC Port Moresby. Should a tropical low reach tropical cyclone strength within the BoM's area of responsibility, it will be assigned the next name from the following naming list.

TCWC Jakarta 
TCWC Jakarta monitors Tropical Cyclones from the Equator to 11S and from 90E to 145E. Should a Tropical Depression reach Tropical Cyclone strength within TCWC Jakarta's Area of Responsibility then it will be assigned the next name from the following list.

TCWC Port Moresby 
Tropical cyclones that develop north of 11°S between 151°E and 160°E are assigned names by the Tropical Cyclone Warning Centre in Port Moresby, Papua New Guinea. Tropical cyclone formation in this area is rare, with no cyclones being named in it since 2007. As names are assigned in a random order, the whole list is shown below:

Season effects

See also 

Weather of 2022 and 2023
List of Southern Hemisphere cyclone seasons
List of off-season Australian region tropical cyclones
Tropical cyclones in 2022, 2023
Atlantic hurricane seasons: 2022, 2023
Pacific hurricane seasons: 2022, 2023
Pacific typhoon seasons: 2022, 2023
North Indian Ocean cyclone seasons: 2022, 2023
2022–23 South-West Indian Ocean cyclone season
2022–23 South Pacific cyclone season

References

External links 

 Australian Bureau of Meteorology
 Joint Typhoon Warning Center
 Tropical Cyclone Warning Center Jakarta 
 Papua New Guinea National Weather Service

Australian region cyclone seasons
2022 meteorology
Tropical cyclones in 2022
2022–23 Australian region cyclone season
2023 meteorology
Tropical cyclones in 2023